St Peter and St Paul is a church in the town of Bromley, Borough of Bromley, in south east London. Known familiarly as Bromley Parish Church, it is not far from Bromley High Street and approximately halfway between Bromley North and Bromley South railway stations. The church is part of the Diocese of Rochester within the Church of England. Largely destroyed by bombing during the Second World War, St Peter and St Paul was rebuilt in the 1950s. It has been Grade II* listed since 1955.

History

Previous church
The pre-World War II church, generally in the Perpendicular style with a square embattled tower having a turret at one of the angles, had its north aisle rebuilt in 1792 and was completely refurbished and enlarged in 1830. Virtually the whole church—with the exception of the tower—was demolished by a bomb on the night of 16 April 1941. Arthur Gresley Hellicar (1835–1905) was Vicar of Bromley from 1865 to 1905.

Present church
On St Edward the Confessor’s Day, 13 October 1949, the foundation stone of the new church was laid by then Princess Elizabeth (later Queen Elizabeth II). Eight years later, the last phase of rebuilding was complete and on 14 December 1957 the new church was consecrated by the Bishop of Rochester, Christopher Maude Chavasse. The present church incorporates the medieval tower and much of the flint and fragments of the original stone building.

Items of interest

Stained glass
Several of the modern windows (including two illustrated below) were designed by M. E. Aldrich Rope, a prolific Arts and Crafts stained glass artist. The Baptistery window is by Clare Dawson, her pupil and co-worker.

Organ
The organ, built in 1991 by J. W. Walker & Sons Ltd, was designed to support congregational worship, to accompany a traditional choir, and as a recital instrument for use alone or with other instruments. It has three manuals and pedals, 40 speaking stops, six couplers, and three tremulants, and comprises 55 ranks with 2,708 pipes. The manual and pedal actions of the organ are mechanical; the stop control is electro-magnetic with a solid state capture combination action. The instrument was made and first assembled in Walker's workshops in Brandon, before being dismantled and installed in the church—it weighs approximately 12 tons. The organ cases, gallery woodwork and carved pipeshades were designed by David Graebe.

The Specification is below;

PEDAL ORGAN (30 notes)

16' Open Diapason

16' Subbass

10⅔' Quint

8' Principal

8' Bass Flute

4' Choral Bass

IV Mixture

32' Contra Trombone (ext.)

16' Trombone

8' Trumpet

Choir to Pedal

Great to Pedal

Swell to Pedal

CHOIR ORGAN (58 notes)

8' Open Diapason

8' Stopped Diapason

4' Principal

4' Open Flute

2⅔' Nasard

2' Gemshorn

13⁄5' Tierce

III Fourniture

8' Trumpet

8' Cromorne

Swell to Choir

GREAT ORGAN (58 notes)

16' Bourdon

8' Open Diapason

8' Chimney Flute

4' Principal

4' Harmonic Flute

2' Fifteenth

IV Fourniture

16' Double Trumpet

8' Trumpet

V Cornet (from middle C)

Choir to Great

Swell to Great

SWELL ORGAN (58 notes)

8' Diapason

8' Voila da Gamba

8' Voix Celeste

8' Stopped Flute

4' Gemshorn

2' Flageolet

IV Mixture

16' Bassoon

8' Trumpet

8' Hautboy

Tombs
Famous people buried at St Peter and St Paul have included:
John Yonge or Young, bishop of Rochester
Elizabeth Johnson, wife of Samuel Johnson: her memorial was salvaged after World War II and re-erected in the rebuilt church On Easter Monday April 23, 1753, Samuel Johnson attended  church here "to take leave of Tetty", he was relieved having done so and was glad to have felt a cooling of his desire to have a new wife.
John Hawkesworth, writer, editor, and friend of Johnson
Zachary Pearce, bishop of Rochester
John Gifford, British political writer and supporter of Pitt the Younger
Sir Claude and Sir Edward Scott, first and second baronets of Lychet Minster

Gallery

See also

 Bromley Parish Church Memorial

References

External links

Bromley Parish Church website

Bromley
Bromley
Rebuilt churches in the United Kingdom
Grade II* listed churches in London
Grade II* listed buildings in the London Borough of Bromley
History of the London Borough of Bromley
Diocese of Rochester